Margaret Young may refer to:

 Margaret Young (1891–1969), American performer
 Margaret Young (1855–1940), Canadian missionary in Nagoya, Japan
 Margaret Blair Young (born 1955), American author, filmmaker and educator
 Margaret Buckner Young (1921–2009), American educator and author
 Tui Manu'a Matelita (1872–1895), Queen of Manu'a in the late 19th century
 Margaret Paulin Young (1864–1953), Scottish headteacher